Thomas or Tom  Bender may refer to:

 Tom Bender (footballer) (born 1993), Welsh footballer
 Thomas H. Bender, American historian
 Tom Bender (architect), American architect, early founder of the green architecture and sustainability movements
 Tom Bender (basketball) (1944–2014), Australian basketball player